Anti-Hindu sentiment, sometimes referred to as Hinduphobia,  is a negative perception, sentiment or actions against the practitioners of Hinduism.

Definitions

Scholar Jeffery D. Long defines the term "Hinduphobia" as an irrational aversion of Hindus or Hinduism. Vamsee Juluri, a Professor of Media Studies at the University of San Francisco agrees.

Other academics are unsure of the existence of "Hinduphobia" in the west. Brian Collins found the tropes of Hinduphobia to be a popular weapon employed by the affluent Hindu diaspora in stifling critical academic discourses on Hinduism — parallels with Kansas creationists were drawn. Scholars affiliated to South Asia Scholar Activist Collective (SASAC) reject "Hinduphobia" as an ahistorical and inappropriate neologism employed by the Hindu Right in order to suppress academic inquiry into topics concerned with Hinduism, Hindutva, caste, and Indian State. While racist and anti-Hindu prejudices have been indeed observed, in their view, Hindus have not faced any entrenched systematic oppression in India or United States.

Examples of anti-Hindu sentiments 
According to the religious dialogue activist P. N. Benjamin, some Christian evangelists denigrate Hindu gods and consider Hindu rituals barbaric, and such attitudes have caused tensions between religious communities.

Akbaruddin Owaisi, a leader of the All India Majlis-e-Ittehadul Muslimeen party in Hyderabad, has been charged several times for hate speeches denigrating Hindu gods and inciting violence against Hindus.

A Muslim preacher apologised for insulting Hinduism in 2014, after an uproar.

Hindus have historically been, and continue to be, considered Kafirs by Muslims and Heathen, Satanic or Demonic by some Christians.

Asia

Afghanistan 

The extremist Taliban regime in Afghanistan, which enforced strict sharia (Islamic law), announced plans to require all Hindus (and Sikhs) to wear identifying badges in public in May 2001, part of the Taliban's campaign to segregate and repress "un-Islamic and idolatrous segments" of Afghan society. At the time, about 500 Hindus and 2,000 Sikhs remained in Afghanistan.

The anti-Hindu decree was seen as being reminiscent of the Nazi law which required all Jews to wear identifying yellow badges. The order prompted international outrage, and it was denounced by the Indian and U.S. governments, as well as by Abraham Foxman of the ADL. Following international pressure, the Taliban regime dropped the badge plans in June 2001.

Religious persecution, discrimination and forced conversion of Hindus has caused Afghanistan's Hindu population to dwindle.

Sikhs and Hindus are continuing to flee from Afghanistan as of July 2020.

Bangladesh 

In Bangladesh political leaders frequently fall back on "Hindu bashing" in an attempt to appeal to extremist sentiment and stir up communal passions. In one of the most notorious utterances of a mainstream Bangladeshi figure, the then Prime Minister Khaleda Zia, while leader of the opposition in 1996, declared that the country was at risk of hearing "uludhhwani" (a Bengali Hindu custom involving women's ululation) from mosques, replacing the azaan (Muslim call to prayer).

Even the more secular-leaning Bangladesh Awami League is not immune from this kind of scare-mongering. The current prime minister, Sheikh Hasina, was alleged to have accused Bangladeshi Hindu leaders in New York of having divided loyalties with "one foot in India and one in Bangladesh". Successive events such as this have contributed to a feeling of tremendous insecurity among the Hindu minority.

The fundamentalists and right-wing parties such as the Bangladesh Nationalist Party and Jatiya Party often portray Hindus as being sympathetic to India, making accusations of dual loyalty and allegations of transferring economic resources to India, contributing to a widespread perception that Bangladeshi Hindus are disloyal to the state. Also, the right wing parties claim the Hindus to be backing the Awami League.

As widely documented in international media, Bangladesh authorities have had to increase security to enable Bangladeshi Hindus to worship freely following widespread attacks on places of worship and devotees.

On 28 February 2013, the International Crimes Tribunal sentenced Delwar Hossain Sayeedi, the Vice President of the Jamaat-e-Islami to death for the war crimes committed during the 1971 Bangladesh Liberation War. Following the sentence, activists of Jamaat-e-Islami and its student wing Islami Chhatra Shibir attacked the Hindus in different parts of the country. Hindu properties were looted, Hindu houses were burnt into ashes and Hindu temples were desecrated and set on fire. While the government has held the Jamaat-e-Islami responsible for the attacks on the minorities, the Jamaat-e-Islami leadership has denied any involvement. The minority leaders have protested the attacks and appealed for justice. The Supreme Court of Bangladesh has directed the law enforcement to start suo motu investigation into the attacks. US Ambassador to Bangladesh express concern about attack of Jamaat on Bengali Hindu community. The violence included the looting of Hindu properties and businesses, the burning of Hindu homes, rape of Hindu women and desecration and destruction of Hindu temples. According to community leaders, more than 50 Hindu temples and 1,500 Hindu homes were destroyed in 20 districts. On 5 May 2014, A mob of almost 3,000 attacked Hindu households and a temple in eastern Bangladesh after two youths from the community allegedly insulted the Islamic prophet, Muhammad on Facebook.

In 17 March 2021, a Muslim mob vandalised around 90 Hindu households and several temples at Shalla Upazilla in Sunamganj district. Media reports that the mob was Hefazat-e-Islam Bangladesh supporters and led by Jubo league (the youth branch of ruling political party Bangladesh Awami League) leader Shahidul Islam Shadhin.

India

Malaysia 

In April 2006, local authorities demolished several Hindu temples to make way for developmental projects. Their reason was that these temples were unlicensed and squatting on government land. In April and May 2006, several Hindu temples were demolished by city hall authorities in the country, accompanied by violence against Hindus. On 21 April 2006, the Malaimel Sri Selva Kaliamman Temple in Kuala Lumpur was reduced to rubble after the city hall sent in bulldozers.

The president of the Consumers Association of Subang and Shah Alam in Selangor had been helping to organise efforts to stop the local authorities in the Muslim dominated city of Shah Alam from demolishing a 107-year-old Hindu temple. The growing Islamization in Malaysia is a cause for concern to many Malaysians who follow minority religions such as Hinduism.

On 11 May 2006, armed city hall officers from Kuala Lumpur forcefully demolished part of a 60-year-old suburban temple that serves more than 1,000 Hindus. The "Hindu Rights Action Force", a coalition of several NGO's, have protested these demolitions by lodging complaints with the Malaysian Prime Minister. Many Hindu advocacy groups have protested what they allege is a systematic plan of temple cleansing in Malaysia. The official reason given by the Malaysian government has been that the temples were built "illegally". However, several of the temples are centuries old.
According to a lawyer for the Hindu Rights Action Task Force, a Hindu temple is demolished in Malaysia once every three weeks.

Malaysian Muslims have also grown more anti-Hindu over the years. In response to the proposed construction of a temple in Selangor, Muslims chopped off the head of a cow to protest, with leaders saying there would be blood if a temple was constructed in Shah Alam.

Laws in the country, especially those concerning religious identity, are generally slanted towards compulsion into converting to Islam.

Pakistan 

In Pakistan, anti-Hindu sentiments and beliefs are widely held among many sections of the population. There is a general stereotype against Hindus in Pakistan. Hindus are regarded as "miserly".<ref>Why are the Jews ‘kanjoos’? —Khaled Ahmed's Review of the Urdu press,Daily times (Pakistan)</ref> Also, Hindus are often regarded as kafirs (unbelievers) and blamed for "causing all the problems in Pakistan". Islamic fundamentalist groups operating within Pakistan and neighboring Afghanistan have broadcast or disseminated anti-Hindu propaganda among the masses, referring to Hindus as "Hanood" ('Hindu' is singular and Hanood is plural form in Urdu) blaming them for "collaborating with the foreigners" against the people of the region.
At the time of Pakistan's creation the 'hostage theory' had been espoused. According to this theory the Hindu minority in Pakistan was to be given a fair deal in Pakistan in order to ensure the protection of the Muslim minority in India. However, Khawaja Nazimuddin, the 2nd Prime Minister of Pakistan, stated: "I do not agree that religion is a private affair of the individual nor do I agree that in an Islamic state every citizen has identical rights, no matter what his caste, creed or faith be".

Separate electorates for Hindus and Christians were established in 1985—a policy which was originally proposed by Islamist leader Abul A'la Maududi. Christian and Hindu leaders complained that they felt excluded from the county's political process, but the policy had strong support from Islamists.

The Muttahida Majlis-i-Amal (MMA), a coalition of Islamist political parties in Pakistan, calls for the increased Islamization of the government and society, specifically taking an anti-Hindu stance. The MMA leads the opposition in the national assembly, held a majority in the NWFP Provincial Assembly, and was part of the ruling coalition in Balochistan. However, some members of the MMA made efforts to eliminate their rhetoric against Hindus.

The public school curriculum in Pakistan was Islamized during the 1980s. The government of Pakistan claims to undertake a major revision to eliminate such teachings and to remove Islamic teaching from secular subjects. The bias in Pakistani textbooks was also documented by Y. Rosser (2003). She wrote that

The bias in Pakistani textbooks was studied by Rubina Saigol, K. K. Aziz, I. A. Rahman, Mubarak Ali, A. H. Nayyar, Ahmed Saleem, Y. Rosser and others.

A study by Nayyar & Salim (2003) that was conducted with 30 experts of Pakistan's education system, found that the textbooks contain statements that seek to create hate against Hindus. There was also an emphasis on Jihad, Shahadat, wars and military heroes. The study reported that the textbooks also had a lot of gender-biased stereotypes. Some of the problems in Pakistani textbooks cited in the report were:

A more recent textbook which was published in Pakistan and titled A Short History of Pakistan, edited by Ishtiaq Hussain Qureshi, has been heavily criticized by academic peer-reviewers for anti-Hindu biases and prejudices that are consistent with Pakistani nationalism, where Hindus are portrayed as "villains" and Muslims as "victims" living under the "disastrous Hindu rule" and "betraying the Muslims to the British", characterizations that academic reviewers found "disquieting" and having a "warped subjectivity".Calkins, P. B. Pacific Affairs, University of British Columbia, pp. 643–644, 1968

Ameer Hamza, a leader of the terrorist group Lashkar-e-Taiba, wrote a highly derogatory book about Hinduism in 1999 called "Hindu Ki Haqeeqat" ("Reality of (a) Hindu"); he was not prosecuted by the Government.

According to the Sustainable Development Policy Institute report 'Associated with the insistence on the Ideology of Pakistan has been an essential component of hate against India and the Hindus. For the upholders of the Ideology of Pakistan, the existence of Pakistan is defined only in relation to Hindus, and hence the Hindus have to be painted as negatively as possible' A 2005 report by the National Commission for Justice and Peace a non profit organization in Pakistan, found that Pakistan Studies textbooks in Pakistan have been used to articulate the hatred that Pakistani policy-makers have attempted to inculcate towards the Hindus. "Vituperative animosities legitimise military and autocratic rule, nurturing a siege mentality. Pakistan Studies textbooks are an active site to represent India as a hostile neighbour", the report stated. "The story of Pakistan's past is intentionally written to be distinct from, and often in direct contrast with, interpretations of history found in India. From the government-issued textbooks, students are taught that Hindus are backward and superstitious." Further the report stated "Textbooks reflect intentional obfuscation. Today's students, citizens of Pakistan and its future leaders are the victims of these partial truths".In Pakistan's Public Schools, Jihad Still Part of Lesson Plan - The Muslim nation's public school texts still promote hatred and jihad, reformers say. By Paul Watson, Times Staff Writer; 18 August 2005; Los Angeles Times. 4 Page article online Retrieved on 2 January 2010Noor's cure: A contrast in views; by Arindam Banerji; 16 July 2003; Rediff India Abroad Retrieved on 2 January 2010

An editorial in Pakistan's oldest newspaper Dawn commenting on a report in The Guardian on Pakistani Textbooks noted that "by propagating concepts such as jihad, the inferiority of non-Muslims, India's ingrained enmity with Pakistan, etc., the textbook board publications used by all government schools promote a mindset that is bigoted and obscurantist. Since there are more children studying in these schools than in madrassahs the damage done is greater."‘School texts spreading more extremism than seminaries’ By Our Special Correspondent; Tuesday, 19 May 2009; Dawn Newspaper. Retrieved 1 January 2010 According to a study by a US government commission, textbooks in Pakistani schools foster prejudice and intolerance of Hindus and other religious minorities, and most teachers view non-Muslims as enemies of Islam. According to the historian Professor Mubarak Ali, textbook reform in Pakistan began with the introduction of Pakistan studies and Islamic studies by Zulfiqar Ali Bhutto in 1971 into the national curriculum as compulsory subject. Former military dictator Gen Zia-ul-Haq under a general drive towards Islamization, started the process of historical revisionism in earnest and exploited this initiative. "The Pakistani establishment taught their children right from the beginning that this state was built on the basis of religion – that's why they don't have tolerance for other religions and want to wipe-out all of them."The threat of Pakistan's revisionist texts, The Guardian, 2009-05-18

 Outside Asia 
Fiji

By the time Fiji gained independence from colonial rule, Hindus and other Indo-Fijians constituted nearly fifty percent of the total Fijian population. Nevertheless, the colonial-era laws and the first constitution for Fiji, granted special rights to native Fijians. These laws relegated Hindus as second class citizens of Fiji without full rights. For example, it denied them property rights, such as the ability to buy or own land. Hindus and other Indo-Fijians have since then not enjoyed equal human rights as other Fijians. They can only work as tenant farmers for Fijian landlords. The difference in human rights has been a continuing source of conflict between "native" Fijians and Indo-Fijians, with native Fijians believing Fiji to be their ancestral land that only they can own, and Indo-Fijians demanding equal rights for all human beings.

Beyond land ownership, Hindus have been persecuted in the Fijian communal structure. Spike Boydell states, "the [colonial authorities] introduced the divisive and unworkable system of communal representation and communal electoral rolls. Thus, different communities were represented by their own kind. This still extends to schooling in a prevailing quasi apartheid educational system."

During the late 1990s, Fiji witnessed a series of riots by radical native Fijians against Hindus (and other Indo-Fijians). In the spring of 2000, the democratically elected Fijian government led by Prime Minister Mahendra Chaudhry, who was a Hindu, was held hostage by a group headed by George Speight. They demanded a segregated state exclusively for the native Fijians, thereby legally abolishing any human rights the Hindu inhabitants held up until then. Hindu owned shops, Hindu schools and temples were destroyed, vandalized and looted.FIJI 2012 INTERNATIONAL RELIGIOUS FREEDOM REPORT

The Methodist Church of Fiji and Rotuma, and particularly Sitiveni Rabuka who led the 1987 coup in Fiji, called for the creation of a Christian State and endorsed forceful conversion of Hindus after a coup d'état in 1987. In 2012, Fiji Methodist Church's president, Tuikilakila Waqairatu, called for Fiji to officially declare Christianity as the state religion; the Hindu community leaders demanded that Fiji be a secular state where religion and state are separate.

 United Kingdom 
After the Leicester riots in October 2022, Hindu groups were set to boycott a review by a man they claimed was an Islamophile.
Conservative Party
Shaun Bailey
In October 2018, it was reported that Conservative Party candidate for the Mayor of London Shaun Bailey had written a pamphlet, entitled No Man’s Land, for the Centre for Policy Studies. In it, Bailey argued that accommodating Hindus "[robs] Britain of its community" and it is also turning the country into a "crime riddled cess pool". He also claimed that South Asians "bring their culture, their country and any problems they might have, with them" and that this was not a problem within the black community "because we’ve shared a religion and in many cases a language". In the pamphlet, Bailey confused the Hindu religion with the Hindi language: "You don’t know what to do. You bring your children to school and they learn far more about Diwali than Christmas. I speak to the people who are from Brent and they’ve been having Hindi (sic) days off." 
James Cleverly
The Conservative Party Deputy Chairman, James Cleverly, defended Bailey and insisted that he was being misunderstood, and he implied that black boys were drifting into crime as a result of learning more about other faiths rather than learning about "their own Christian culture". However, the anti-racism Hope Not Hate campaign group called Bailey's comments "grotesque".

 United States 

The rise of the Indian American community in the United States has triggered some isolated attacks on them, as has been the case with many minority groups in the United States. Attacks which specifically target Hindus in the United States stem from what is often referred to as the "racialization of religion" among Americans, a process that begins when certain phenotypical features which are associated with a group and attached to race in popular discourse become associated with a particular religion or religions. The racialization of Hinduism in American perception has led Americans to perceive Hindus as belonging to a separate group and this contributes to prejudices against them.

In 2019, Swaminarayan Temple in Kentucky was vandalised. They sprayed black paint on the deity and sprayed "Jesus is the only God" on the walls. The Christian cross was also spray painted on various walls. In April 2015, a Hindu temple in north Texas was vandalised when nasty images were spray-painted on its walls. In February 2015, Hindu temples in Kent and the Seattle Metropolitan area were also vandalised.

In July 2019, a Hindu Priest who was dressed in his religious attire was physically beaten in Queens, New York, two blocks from Shiv Shakti Peeth Temple in Glen Oaks by Sergio Gouveia. A Senator and New York State Attorney General have called it a hate crime because "If someone is targeted because of religious robe and couple of blocks from temple where he resides it is difficult to believe this was random." Yet, the New York police have not registered it as a hate crime.

 Pat Robertson 
In addition, anti-Hindu views have been expressed which are specifically based on misperceptions of the religion of Hinduism as well as mistaken racial perceptions. In the United States Pat Robertson has denounced Hinduism as "demonic", believing that when Hindus "feel any sort of inspiration, whether it's by a river or under a tree, on top of a hill, they figure that some God or spirit is responsible for that. And so they'll worship that tree, they'll worship that hill or they'll worship anything." His remarks were widely condemned and disputed by Indian Americans and members of many non-partisan advocacy groups. Evangelical leader Albert Mohler defended Robertson's remarks, saying "any belief system, any world view, whether it's Zen Buddhism or Hinduism or dialectical materialism for that matter, Marxism, that keeps persons captive and keeps them from coming to faith in the Lord Jesus Christ, yes, is a demonstration of satanic power."

 United States Congress 

In July, 2007, The United States Senate conducted its morning prayer services with a Hindu prayer, a historical first. During the service, three disruptors, named Ante Nedlko Pavkovic, Katherine Lynn Pavkovic and Christen Renee Sugar, from the Fundamentalist Christian activist group Operation Save America protested by arguing that the Hindu prayer was "an abomination", and they also claimed that they were "Christians and Patriots". They were swiftly arrested and charged with disrupting Congress.

The event generated a storm of protest by Christian right groups in the country, with the American Family Association (AFA) opposing the prayer and carrying out a campaign to lobby senators to protest against it.A Prayer and Protest, Las Vegas Sun (13 July 2007). Their representative attacked the proceedings as "gross idolatry". The AFA sent an "Action Alert" to its members in which it asked them to e-mail, write letters, or call their Senators and ask them to oppose the Hindu prayer, stating that it is "seeking the invocation of a non-monotheistic god." The "alert" stated that "since Hindus worship multiple gods, the prayer will be completely outside the American paradigm, flying in the face of the American motto One Nation Under God." The convocation by Zed was in fact disrupted by three protesters in the gallery reportedly shouting "this is an abomination" and other complaints.

Barry W. Lynn, executive director of Americans United for Separation of Church and State, said the protest "shows the intolerance of many religious right activists. They say they want more religion in the public square, but it's clear they mean only their religion."

 California Textbook Controversy 

A controversy in the US state of California concerning the portrayal of Hinduism in history textbooks began in 2005. A protest was led by Vedic Foundation (VF) and the American Hindu Education Foundation (HEF) by complaining to the California's Curriculum Commission, saying the coverage in sixth grade history textbooks of Indian history and Hinduism was biased against Hinduism; and points of contention includes a textbook's portrayal of the caste system, the Indo-Aryan migration theory, and the status of women in Indian society as the main features of Hinduism.

The California Department of Education (CDE) initially sought to resolve the controversy by appointing Shiva Bajpai, Professor Emeritus at California State University Northridge, as a one-man committee to review revisions proposed by the groups. Michael Witzel and others revisited the proposed changed on behalf of the State Board of Education and suggested reverting some of the approved changes. In early 2006, the Hindu American Foundation sued the State Board over matters of process; the case was settled in 2009.

 Dotbusters 

The Dotbusters was a hate group in Jersey City, New Jersey, that attacked and threatened Indian-Americans in the fall of 1987. The name originates from the bindi traditionally worn by Hindu women and girls on their forehead. In July 1987, they had a letter published in the Jersey Journal'' stating that they would take any means necessary to drive the Indians out of Jersey City:
I'm writing about your article during july [sic] about the abuse of Indian People. Well I'm here to state the other side. I hate them, if you had to live near them you would also. We are an organization called dot busters. We have been around for 2 years. We will go to any extreme to get Indians to move out of Jersey City. If I'm walking down the street and I see a Hindu and the setting is right, I will hit him or her. We plan some of our most extreme attacks such as breaking windows, breaking car windows, and crashing family parties. We use the phone books and look up the name Patel. Have you seen how many of them there are? Do you even live in Jersey City? Do you walk down Central avenue and experience what its [sic] like to be near them: we have and we just don't want it anymore. You said that they will have to start protecting themselves because the police cannot always be there. They will never do anything. They are a weak [sic] race physically and mentally. We are going to continue our way. We will never be stopped.

See also 
 Anti-Indian sentiment
 Antiziganism
 Indomania

Notes

References

Sources

Further reading 
 
 
 
 .

External links 

 

 
Persecution of Hindus